Buckeye–Woodhill is a neighborhood on the East Side of Cleveland, Ohio. It borders the neighborhoods of University Circle and Fairfax to the north, Kinsman to the west, Buckeye–Shaker to the east, and Mount Pleasant to the south. Once a predominantly Hungarian neighborhood, its population is today largely African American. Formerly known as Woodland Hills, it is politically part of Cleveland's Ward 6.

References

Neighborhoods in Cleveland